The 2002 World Junior Figure Skating Championships was held from March 3 to 10 at the Hamar Olympic Amphitheatre in Hamar, Norway. Medals were awarded in men's singles, ladies' singles, pair skating, and ice dancing. Due to the large number of participants, the men's and ladies' qualifying groups were split into groups A and B. The first compulsory dance was the Viennese Waltz and the second was the Quickstep.

Medals table

Results

Men
Daisuke Takahashi was the first Japanese male skater to win the ISU World Junior Championships.

Kevin van der Perren was the first Belgian skater ever to take a medal (silver) at an ISU World Junior Championships.

Ladies

Pairs

Ice dancing

References

External links
 2002 World Junior Figure Skating Championships
 

World Junior Figure Skating Championships
World Junior Figure Skating Championships, 2002
F
World Junior 2002